James Michael McBain (born February 25, 1988) is an American former professional ice hockey defenseman who played in the National Hockey League (NHL). McBain was born in Edina, Minnesota, but grew up in Faribault, Minnesota. He attended college at the University of Wisconsin-Madison.

Playing career
McBain was drafted in the third round, 63rd overall, in the 2006 NHL Entry Draft by the Carolina Hurricanes. On March 26, 2009, he signed a three-year, $1.8 million, entry-level contract with the Hurricanes.

McBain scored his first career NHL goal on March 20, 2010, with one second remaining in overtime against Marc-André Fleury of the Pittsburgh Penguins.

Upon the start of the 2010–11 season, McBain began wearing the number 4 jersey instead of number 28, which he had previously worn during the 2009–10 season. McBain was selected to participate in the 2011 NHL All-Star Game, as a replacement for Jordan Eberle. He played in the All-Star game along with teammates Eric Staal, Jeff Skinner, and Cam Ward.

On May 21, 2012, Carolina announced that McBain had agreed to a two-year contract extension worth US$3.6 million after an impressive season in which he led all Hurricanes defensemen with 19 assists and 27 points. The contract was structured so that McBain will make $1.7 million in 2012–13 and $1.9 million in 2013–14. In the statement announcing the contract extension, then-Hurricanes General Manager Jim Rutherford said, "Jamie is still a very young player who has established himself as an NHL defenseman. He moves the puck well and has shown that he can contribute offensively, especially on the power play."

During the 2012–13 NHL lockout, McBain signed a temporary contract with Finnish club Lahti Pelicans of the SM-liiga on November 2, 2012. He participated in seven games for the Pelicans for one assist before returning to North America for the shortened 2012–13 season.

On June 30, 2013, during the 2013 NHL Entry Draft, McBain was traded to the Buffalo Sabres, along with Carolina's second-round pick, in exchange for defenseman Andrej Sekera. After one season with the Sabres, the Sabres declined to offer him a contract extension.

As a free agent, McBain attended the Arizona Coyotes' training camp on a player-tryout offer, but was ultimately released by the team, unsigned. On October 31, 2014, McBain belatedly began the 2014–15 season by agreeing to a professional try-out contract with the Manchester Monarchs of the American Hockey League (AHL). After six games with the Monarchs, McBain was signed to a one-year, two-way contract with the team's NHL affiliate, the Los Angeles Kings, on November 11, 2014. McBain wore number 5 for Los Angeles.

On July 1, 2016, McBain signed as a free agent to a one-year, two-way contract with the Arizona Coyotes. He made the opening night roster for the Coyotes and appeared in 3 scoreless games to begin the 2016–17 season. He was then placed on waivers and assigned to AHL affiliate, the Tucson Roadrunners, for the remainder of the year. He contributed with 43 points in 64 games.

On July 1, 2017, McBain left the Coyotes as a free agent and signed a one-year, two-way contract with the Tampa Bay Lightning. After appearing at training camp, McBain was assigned to their AHL affiliate, the Syracuse Crunch, to start the season. McBain was made one of seven alternative captains for Syracuse at the beginning of the 2017–18 season.

Personal
McBain married Elizabeth Milner on July 5, 2014, in North Carolina. Their son was born on November 2, 2015 in the Los Angeles area.

Career statistics

Regular season and playoffs

International

Awards and honors

References

External links

1988 births
Albany River Rats players
American men's ice hockey defensemen
Arizona Coyotes players
Buffalo Sabres players
Carolina Hurricanes draft picks
Carolina Hurricanes players
Ice hockey players from Minnesota
Living people
Los Angeles Kings players
Manchester Monarchs (AHL) players
Ontario Reign (AHL) players
Lahti Pelicans players
People from Faribault, Minnesota
Sportspeople from Edina, Minnesota
Syracuse Crunch players
Tucson Roadrunners players
Wisconsin Badgers men's ice hockey players
AHCA Division I men's ice hockey All-Americans